Palace of Eternal Longevity (Pinyin: Yongshougong) is one of the Six Western Palaces in the Forbidden City. It was a residence of imperial concubines since 1420.

History 
Yongshou Palace was built in 1420 as a part of Inner Court's western palaces and named "Palace of Eternal Pleasure" (长乐宫,  pinyin: Changle gong). In 1535, the Jiajing Emperor renamed the palace as "Palace of Embodying Morality" (毓德宫, pinyin: yudegong). In 1616, the palace obtained its current name. Yongshou Palace was undergoing renovations in 1697 and 1897. During the Qianlong period, the palace was used as a place of wedding banquets for Princess Heke of the Second Rank in 1772 and Gurun Princess Hexiao in 1789. During the Daoguang era, rear halls of the palace became a storage of classified intelligence.

It is the closest palace to Yangxin hall, the residence of Qing dynasty emperors from 1722.

Residents

Ming dynasty

Qing dynasty

References 

Forbidden City